Bundang Central Park (분당 중앙 공원) is located at the heart of the recently developed residential area, Bundang. It is one of the two big parks in Bundang, the other is Yuldong Park in Bundang-dong. It is 500 meters away from Seohyeon Station.

Facilities
Central Park is well administered and offers a large number of facilities for local residents. 30 meters along the path from the main entrance to the park, into the forest on the left hand side, are the badminton courts. The three courts that are available are a wonderful place to play since the shade from the trees really helps players avoid the heat.  At the top of Youngjangsan there is a large quantity of exercise equipment.  There is so much, in fact, that you could mistake the area for an outdoor health club.  A small membership fee is required for use of the equipment.  Along Bundang Stream there is a well paved bicycle trail, which extends for several kilometers out of the park and through Bundang, all the way to Yuldong Park.  A ways up the mountain, surrounded by the trees of the forest is croquet course.  The shade of the trees can protect players even on the hottest of days.  In addition, there is an outdoor theater, where performances are held during the warm months.  Bathrooms at Central Park are clean and kept in relatively good condition.

Youngjangsan
Youngjangsan (영장산, 靈長山) is the 88 meter high mountain that occupies the bulk of the park's area and adds a spectacular piece of scenery to the Bundang area.  This pristine mountain offers a large number of walking trails for an easy morning of hiking.  Along the well marked trails are a number of benches and markers directing hikers to the various sections of the park.  On the south face of the mountain you will come across a trio of dolmens (고인돌), underwhich, at one time the most important people in the local village would have been buried; this was once a time honored tradition in ancient Korea.  There are also a large number of well-cared for tombstones that are easily visible from below.  Travel to the summit of the mountain and you will find an outdoor exercise yard complete with weight lifting equipment which always seems to be in use by local men. On the adjacent eight-sided pavilion, called Youngjangdae(영장대), you will nearly always finds groups of men playing baduk or janggi.

Bundang Pond
Bundang Pond (분당호, 盆唐湖) is the large body of water in the center of Central Park. It is next to Central Square (중앙광장, 中央廣場), the large rollerblading area, where the administration building and Sunae House can also be seen. One of the symbols of the park is the large fountain in the middle of the pond, which periodically puts on water shows, shooting water high up into the air. Around the pond, there are several large and small traditional Korean pavilions nearby, where visitors can while away the hours.  The largest one is the two-story Dolmagak Palace (돌마각누각), a traditional pavilion left over from the last Korean royal dynasty. Close by you will find a Korean traditional lily pad, which is wonderful to see in the summer time. On the opposite side there is another popular attraction, is the traditional Sunaejeongja (수내정자, 藪內亭子), a secluded summerhouse, whose design was taken from Changdeokgung. Nearby is a traditional water mill. During the mid-1990s the pond was well stocked with Koi during the warmer months.

Sunae House
Sunae House (수내동가옥, 藪內家) is Gyeonggi-do cultural treasure number 78, a private home constructed at the end of the Joseon Dynasty. It is all that remains of the seventy such homes that once formed the village that previously existed before being demolished for the construction of the new Bundang. The large pavilion, lotus pond and zelkova tree (느티나무) that had sat at the entrance to the village have also been preserved. Inside the square shaped yard is the L-shaped main building, with the rear of the building 10 kan (칸) in length. Arranged along the length of the house can be found the inner room (안방) and the main hall (대청), and along the short end is the kitchen and store room. The house was heated using the tradition Korean ondol (온돌) and is also complete with typical farming, household equipment, and models of people acting out a typical day for that time. Sunae House is by Central Square.

References

Bundang
Parks in Gyeonggi Province